Carroll is a village in Fairfield County, Ohio, United States. The population was 524 at the 2010 census.

History
Carroll was laid out in 1829 at the junction of two canals. The village was named after Charles Carroll of Carrollton (1737–1832), American politician, delegate to the second Continental Congress, and last surviving signer of the Declaration of Independence.

Local farmer David Brandt's no-till farming using cover crops was featured in the national press in 2013.

Geography
Carroll is located at  (39.799228, -82.704311).

Demographics

2010 census
As of the census of 2010, there were 524 people, 208 households, and 147 families living in the village. The racial makeup of the village was 96.2% White, 0.6% African American, 0.4% Native American, 0.2% Asian, and 2.7% from two or more races.

There were 208 households, of which 36.5% had children under the age of 18 living with them, 45.2% were married couples living together, 18.3% had a female householder with no husband present, 7.2% had a male householder with no wife present, and 29.3% were non-families. 24.0% of all households were made up of individuals, and 9.2% had someone living alone who was 65 years of age or older. The average household size was 2.52 and the average family size was 2.94.

The median age in the village was 38 years. 25.4% of residents were under the age of 18; 10.1% were between the ages of 18 and 24; 26.9% were from 25 to 44; 23.9% were from 45 to 64; and 13.7% were 65 years of age or older. The gender makeup of the village was 51.0% male and 49.0% female.

2000 census
As of the census of 2000, there were 488 people, 189 households, and 130 families living in the village. The population density was 1,777.3 people per square mile (697.8/km2). There were 205 housing units at an average density of 746.6 per square mile (293.2/km2). The racial makeup of the village was 99.59% White, 0.20% Native American and 0.20% Asian. Hispanic or Latino of any race were 0.20% of the population.

There were 189 households, out of which 34.4% had children under the age of 18 living with them, 52.9% were married couples living together, 12.2% had a female householder with no husband present, and 30.7% were non-families. 27.0% of all households were made up of individuals, and 9.5% had someone living alone who was 65 years of age or older. The average household size was 2.58 and the average family size was 3.12.

In the village, the population was spread out, with 26.8% under the age of 18, 9.8% from 18 to 24, 31.4% from 25 to 44, 20.5% from 45 to 64, and 11.5% who were 65 years of age or older. The median age was 34 years. For every 100 females there were 89.9 males. For every 100 females age 18 and over, there were 90.9 males.

The median income for a household in the village was $40,221, and the median income for a family was $41,250. Males had a median income of $31,354 versus $22,344 for females. The per capita income for the village was $16,311. About 4.0% of families and 5.7% of the population were below the poverty line, including 3.5% of those under age 18 and 18.8% of those age 65 or over.

Education
The Bloom-Carroll Local School District operates an elementary, middle, and high school in the village. Carroll has a public library, a branch of the Fairfield County District Library.

Notable people
James J. Jeffries, World Heavyweight Boxing Champion known as "The Boilermaker"
Tom Crabtree, professional football player for the Green Bay Packers

References

External links
Fairfield County Visitors and Convention Bureau

Villages in Fairfield County, Ohio
Villages in Ohio